is a train station located in Miyama, Fukuoka.

Lines 
Nishi-Nippon Railroad
Tenjin Ōmuta Line

Platforms

Adjacent stations

Surrounding area
 Takada Town Office
 Wataze Station
 Fukuoka Bank Wataze Branch
 Yokokura Hospital
 Takatanoseyama Park
 Hiraki Elementary School
 Futakawa Elementary School
 Japan National Route 208
 Japan National Route 209

References

Railway stations in Fukuoka Prefecture
Railway stations in Japan opened in 1938